San Miguel is one of the 43 districts that are part of the Lima province and is part of the urban area of Lima, Peru. It is bordered by the districts of Bellavista and downtown Lima on the north; Pueblo Libre, Magdalena del Mar and downtown Lima on the east; the Pacific Ocean on the south; and the La Perla district on the west. It is located 20 to 30 min from the airport (depending on the traffic).

San Miguel is an upper-class (65% of its population) and upper-middle class (35%) district with a very high HDI.

Its main avenues – La Marina, Universitaria and Elmer Faucett – are important economic centres. Plaza San Miguel mall, some hypermarkets and department stores are located in the intersection of La Marina and Universitaria. The Pontifical Catholic University of Peru, the Plaza San Miguel and the Parque de las Leyendas, Lima's main zoo, are located in this district.

Its current mayor is Juan José Guevara  (2019-2022) 

The weather in San Miguel is moderately different from the other districts: it is often windy, cloudy and has lower temperature.

Gallery

See also 
 Administrative divisions of Peru

References

External links
  Municipalidad de San Miguel - San Miguel district council official site

Districts of Lima